The Henry Gruene Family Home is a Victorian-style house that was constructed in 1872.  The Gruene Family Home, though not listed individually on the National Register of Historic Places, is a contributing property to Gruene Historic District, which was listed in 1974. Presently, the home operates as the Gruene Mansion Inn in the Gruene Community of New Braunfels, Texas. Deep in tradition, the mansion was one of the first buildings in Gruene, in 1872. The Gruene Mansion Inn began as H.D. Gruene's historic Eastlake Victorian home and cotton plantation. All current accommodations are century-old barns and homes restored to our own Victorian Rustic Elegance - A combination of antiques, fine fabrics, and handmade furniture. Every room has a unique character and offers details such as clawfoot tubs and deep pedestal sinks. Gruene Mansion Inn is listed as one of the top inns in the state of Texas.

See also

National Register of Historic Places listings in Comal County, Texas
Recorded Texas Historic Landmarks in Comal County

References

External links

 Official Gruene, Texas, web site
 
 Official Gruene Hall web site
 Gruene Mansion Inn
 

Houses on the National Register of Historic Places in Texas
Houses in Comal County, Texas
New Braunfels, Texas
Historic district contributing properties in Texas
National Register of Historic Places in Comal County, Texas